The 42nd Street Airlines Terminal, on the southwest corner of Park Avenue and 42nd Street in Midtown Manhattan, was the first of three airline terminals constructed in New York City. It was located at the site of the former Hotel Belmont. During this period of aviation, reservations, ticketing and baggage handling took place at this facility for the airlines American, Eastern, TWA, United and Pan Am. Passengers would be transferred by bus to Newark Airport, and later to the New York International Airport.

The changing economics and increasing popularity of air travel eventually led to the creation of new air terminals: the East Side Airline Terminal near the Queens Midtown Tunnel and the West Side Airline Terminal near the Lincoln Tunnel. In 1954 this facility, which had become restricted to ticketing only, was renamed the Airlines Building. The declining importance of the facility led to its demolition in 1978, to become the site of the Philip Morris Building at 120 Park Avenue.

References 

1941 establishments in New York City
42nd Street (Manhattan)
Demolished buildings and structures in Manhattan
Park Avenue
Transport infrastructure completed in 1941
Buildings and structures demolished in 1978